PCT, P.C.T. or pct may refer to:

Math, science and technology 

 pct, an abbreviation for "%" (percentage)
 PCT theorem, on parity, charge and time inversions
 Perceptual control theory, a model of behavior
 Personal Communication Telephone, a mobile telephone service
 Polychlorinated terphenyl, an industrial chemical
 Polycyclohexylenedimethylene terephthalate, a thermoplastic polyester
 Private Communications Technology, an obsolete Internet security protocol
 Programmable communicating thermostat, California, US term
 Projected capacitive touchscreen technology

Medicine 
 Patient care technician
 Person-centered therapy
 Porphyria cutanea tarda, the most common subtype of porphyria
 Postcoital test, for infertility
 Post-coital tristesse
 Pragmatic clinical trial
 Primary care trusts, UK NHS bodies 2001–2013
 Procalcitonin, a precursor of the hormone calcitonin
 Progestogen challenge test
 Proximal convoluted tubule, in the kidney
 Proton computed tomography (pCT), or proton CT

Places 
 Pacific Crest Trail, US hiking trail from Mexico–US to Canada–US border
 Potomac Consolidated TRACON, FAA facility designation
 Princeton Airport (New Jersey), Montgomery Township, New Jersey, US, IATA code

Politics 
 Communist Party of Togo (French: Parti Communiste du Togo)
 Congolese Party of Labour (French: Parti Congolais du Travail)
 Tunisian Communist Party (French: Parti Communiste Tunisien)

Other 
 P.C.T, hip-hop musicians
 Paleolithic continuity theory, suggesting the Proto-Indo-European language comes from the Upper Paleolithic
 Patent Cooperation Treaty, an international patent treaty
 Pennsylvania College of Technology
 Phi Chi Theta, fraternity
 Presbyterian Church in Taiwan
 Production Car Trial – see classic trials